National Secondary Route 167, or just Route 167 (or ) is a National Road Route of Costa Rica, located in the San José province.

Description
In San José province the route covers San José canton (Hospital, Mata Redonda districts), Escazú canton (San Rafael district).

References

Highways in Costa Rica